Yuri Viktorovich Kushnarev (born 6 June 1985) is a former Russian rugby union player. He played as a fullback and/or as a fly-half. Kushnarev is the most capped Russian player as well as the top scorer for Russia. Having played over one-hundred and fifteen times, Kushnarev holds the nineteenth most caps in international rugby and is the eight most capped European rugby player.

Club career
Yuri Kushnarev is the most titled rugby player of Russia. He first played for VVA, from 2002 to 2012, where he won seven titles of Russia, then for RC Kuban, in 2013. Since from 2014 Kushnarev plays for Krasnoyarsk clubs. Since 2014 to 2018, for Enisei-STM. From 2019 to 2021 for Krasny Yar.

Honours
 Russian Championship (11): 2003, 2004, 2006, 2007, 2008, 2009, 2010, 2014, 2016, 2017, 2018
 Russian Cup (9): 2002, 2004, 2005, 2007, 2010, 2014, 2016, 2017, 2019
 Russian Supercup (3): 2014, 2015, 2017
 European Rugby Continental Shield (2): 2016–17, 2017–18

International career

Kushnarev finished his international career for Russia with over one-hundred and fifteen caps. And since 2005 with ten tries, one-hundred and forty seven conversions, one-hundred and thirty seven penalties and  one drop goal. Overall over seven-hundred and fifty points on aggregate. Kushnarev was part of the Russian squad at the 2011 Rugby World Cup, playing in three games and scoring one penalty. He also played at the unsuccessful attempt to qualify for the 2015 Rugby World Cup and was a key player in the team that reached their qualification for the 2019 Rugby World Cup. At the 2019 Rugby World Cup, Kushnarev scored one conversion, three penalty goals, and one drop goal. In total he scored fourteen points for Russia.

Notes

References

External links

1985 births
Living people
Russia international rugby union players
Russian rugby union players
Sportspeople from Moscow
Rugby union fly-halves
RC Kuban players
VVA Podmoskovye players